The 1997–98 South Alabama Jaguars basketball team represented the University of South Alabama as members of the Sun Belt Conference during the 1997–98 NCAA Division I men's basketball season. The Jaguars were led by head coach Bob Weltlich and played their home games at the Mitchell Center. They finished the season 21–7, 14–4 in Sun Belt play to finish in first place. They won the Sun Belt tournament to earn an automatic bid to the 1998 NCAA tournament as the 12 seed in the Southeast region. In the opening round, the Jaguars lost to No. 5 seed Illinois.

Roster

Schedule and results

|-
!colspan=9 style=| Non-Conference Regular season

|-
!colspan=9 style=| Sun Belt Regular season

|-
!colspan=9 style=| Sun Belt Conference tournament

|-
!colspan=9 style=| NCAA tournament

References

South Alabama Jaguars men's basketball seasons
South Alabama
South Alabama
1997 in sports in Alabama
1998 in sports in Alabama